Paulina Joanna Boenisz (born 28 September 1978 in Warsaw) is a three-time Olympic modern pentathlete from Poland. She is also a six-time Polish national champion and a multiple-time medalist at the World Championships, where she won four golds for both women's team and relay events.

Boenisz achieved her best results, and consistently performed in the women's event at the Olympics, finishing fifth in 2000, tenth in 2004, and fifth in 2008.

References

External links
 

1978 births
Living people
Polish female modern pentathletes
Olympic modern pentathletes of Poland
Modern pentathletes at the 2000 Summer Olympics
Modern pentathletes at the 2004 Summer Olympics
Modern pentathletes at the 2008 Summer Olympics
Sportspeople from Warsaw
World Modern Pentathlon Championships medalists